Brusturi may refer to several places in Romania:

 Brusturi, Bihor, a commune in Bihor County
 Brusturi, Neamț, a commune in Neamţ County
 Brusturi, a village in Hălmagiu Commune, Arad County
 Brusturi, a village in Finiș Commune, Bihor County
 Brusturi, a village in Creaca Commune, Sălaj County
 Brestovăț, a commune in Timiș County, briefly called Brusturi